Amtala is a town, with a college, not identified in 2011 census, in the Naoda CD block in the Berhampore subdivision of Murshidabad district in the state of West Bengal, India.

Geography

Location

Area overview
The area shown in the map alongside, covering Berhampore and Kandi subdivisions, is spread across both the natural physiographic regions of the district, Rarh and Bagri. The headquarters of Murshidabad district, Berhampore, is in this area. The entire area is overwhelmingly rural with over 80% of the population living in the rural areas.

Note: The map alongside presents some of the notable locations in the subdivisions. All places marked in the map are linked in the larger full screen map.

Social background

The area around Amtala is a rich agricultural area, which is somewhat cut off from the outside world. The nearest railway station, Beldanga is around 23 km away and buses for Baharampur few and far between. The population is largely Muslim and education particularly amongst the girls was not encouraged. They were married off early. The social reformation started with the setting up of Amtala High School, a co-educational institution. However, the conservative community was not eager to send the girls to such a school, post class VIII. The young girls continued to be married off early. With the help of a few liberal intellectuals, the forward-looking section of the population established a girls’ school, Anandaoni Balika Vidyalaya. Very slowly the education of girls was promoted and more and more people were getting convinced about the need for girls’ education. The next hurdle was a college. The nearest college was 22 km away. Jatindra Rajendra Mahavidyalaya was started in 1986 with 36 students, one third of them being girls.

Education
Jatindra Rajendra Mahavidyalaya was established in 1986 at Amtala. Guru Prasad Biswas and Birendranath Biswas made a handsome contribution, and the college was named after the fathers of both the donors. The land was provided by Amtala High School. Affiliated with the University of Kalyani, it offers honours courses in Bengali, English, Arabic, history, philosophy, political science and education.
Amtala High School was established in 1919. It is a coeducational institution up to 12th class.
Amtala Anadamani Balika Vidyalaya was established in 1972. It is a girls’ school up to 12th class.

Healthcare
Amtala Rural Hospital, with 50 beds, is the major government medical facility in Naoda CD block.

References

Cities and towns in Murshidabad district